Dustin Cook (born February 11, 1989) is a Canadian former World Cup alpine ski racer. Born in Toronto, Ontario, he won a silver medal in the Super-G at the 2015 World Championships at Beaver Creek, USA.

Cook made his first World Cup podium in March 2015, in a Super-G at Kvitfjell, Norway, and won his first race eleven days later at the World Cup finals in Méribel, France.

Career
Born in Toronto, Cook has lived in Lac-Sainte-Marie since he was ten. When he was five he competed in his first ski race, and when he was twelve he made the regional high performance ski team. Cook has 23 Nor-Am Cup podiums, ranking him tied for fifth among men for most podiums in Nor-Am Cup history as of the end of the 2014/15 season.

His first podium came in 2015 at the FIS Alpine World Ski Championships 2015 when he finished 2nd in the Super G at Beaver Creek. Cook became the first Canadian man to medal in a Super G at the World Championships. He also finished twelfth in Giant Slalom at the World Championships one week later. His first FIS Alpine World Cup podium came one month later when he finished 3rd in the Super G at Kvitfjell. He won his first race eleven days later at the World Cup Finals in Meribel. Cook finished the 2015 season with five top twenty World Cup finishes, in addition to his two podiums and World Championship medal. He finished the 2015 season ranked 5th in Super G, and 30th in Giant Slalom.

With his World Championship medal Cook became the eighth and final member of the Canadian Cowboys

World Cup results

Season standings

Standings through 20 January 2019

Race podiums
 1 win – (1 SG)
 2 podiums – (2 SG)

World Championships results

Olympic results

Other

Most Valuable Participant: Craigleith Men's Day 2016

References

External links
 
 Dustin Cook World Cup standings at the International Ski Federation
 
 
 
 Dustin Cook at Alpine Canada
 

1989 births
Canadian male alpine skiers
Living people
Skiers from Toronto
Alpine skiers at the 2018 Winter Olympics
Olympic alpine skiers of Canada